Maryny Tsvetaievoi (from 2000 to 2008, Tsvetaievoi) is a station on the Livoberezhna Line of the Kyiv Light Rail system. It was opened on May 26, 2000 and reopened after a significant modernization of the line on October 26, 2012.

Maryny Tsvetaievoi is located in between the Myloslavska and Oleksandra Saburova stations. It is named in honour of Marina Tsvetaeva, a Russian poet.

At one point the Kyiv City authorities proposed connecting the Maryny Tsvetaievoi station with a perspective station of the Kyiv Metro's Livoberezhna Line, although that entire project was scrapped in favor of expanding the existing light rail system.

References

External links
 
 

Kyiv Light Rail stations
Railway stations opened in 2000
2000 establishments in Ukraine